Vaughn Lowery was born and raised in Detroit with four siblings. Lowery graduated from Cornell University's School of Industrial & Labor Relations. He is a member of Alpha Phi Alpha fraternity (Alpha chapter).

Vaughn is best known for his TV appearances on “America's Next Top Model,” “Scrubs,” and as the exclusive spokesperson for JOE BOXER. Vaughn's first leading film role in The Young & Evil was an official selection of Sundance.

Vaughn was born in Detroit. When it came time to go to college, he received a full scholarship to Cornell University. From there, he became active in modeling, acting, and producing screenplays. Now, Vaughn is the publisher and founder of 360 Magazine.

Vaughn appeared in Kmart’s Joe Boxer commercial, dancing his self-titled “Boxer Boogie” dance, wearing nothing but his Joe Boxer underwear. He appeared with Leeza Gibbons on “Extra”, Katie Couric on “Today Show”, and Jay Leno on “Tonight Show” to perform his signature dance. According to the Detroit Free Press, Vaughn’s “Boxer Boogie” has paid off, helping Kmart sell roughly $20 million in Joe Boxer apparel a week.” In just the first year he was responsible for Kmart selling over $1.5 billion of duds, besting Martha Stewart’s launch year with over $500 million in sales.

The Detroit native embarked on an acting and modeling career during a trip to New York City when make-up artist Sam Fine set him up with a fashion photographer, Fadil Berisha. Before his appearance as “Joe Boxer,”  Vaughn worked as a print model for such companies as Gap, Target, Skechers, Old Navy, Bath & Body Works Fragrance, Nordstrom, and Marc Ecko. He also worked as a runway model for Tommy Hilfiger, Phat Farm, and Karl Kani. He has graced the pages of FHM (SA), URB Magazine, and Glamour.

A few years back, ABC News “Primetime” aired a segment chronicling Vaughn’s life, along with the tragic John Ritter story. Vaughn has also filmed a Super Bowl commercial, completed a high-profile Dasani Water billboard ad campaign, appeared on “America’s Next Top Model,” guest-starred on the comedy, “Scrubs,” and screened his 35mm festival film, “The Young & Evil,” at Sundance 2009, which was nominated for Cardiff’s Iris Prize within the same year. He was also named Seventeen Magazine’s “17 Hot Guys.” The last film Vaughn acted in is called “The Company We Keep” (directed by Roy Campanella), where he plays a fast-talking manager within the record industry, Barry. Currently, Vaughn is in the midst of producing a short film “Chasen Life,” which won a writing competition. He is also adapting his audiobook “Say Uncle” into a feature-length film and pitching his third reality series. Moreover, he's in the process of establishing 360 Fest, a film festival that will introduce and screen shorts and features in the world.

Outside of his entertainment endeavors, Vaughn has lent his name and support to: Women At Risk, Human Rights Commission, March of Dimes, Heart of Los Angeles Youth, and schools across the nation where he encourages kids to be their best. Furthermore, Vaughn serves as the Brand Ambassador for both Falling Whistles, which supports war-affected kids in the Congo, and Pink United for breast cancer awareness. He sits on the board of Awakening Young Minds, a nonprofit organization that conducts emotional education workshops for troubled youth.

References

External links

Year of birth missing (living people)
Living people
American male film actors
American male television actors
Cornell University alumni
Male actors from Detroit
African-American male models
African-American models
American male models
Male models from Michigan
21st-century African-American people